"The Wrong Place" is a song by Belgian band Hooverphonic. The song represented Belgium in the Eurovision Song Contest 2021 in Rotterdam, the Netherlands, after being internally selected by the national broadcasters Vlaamse Radio- en Televisieomroeporganisatie (VRT) and Radio Télévision Belge de la Communauté Française (RTBF).

Eurovision Song Contest

Internal selection 
On 20 March 2020, VRT and RTBF announced Belgian band Hooverphonic as the country's representative for the Eurovision Song Contest 2021.

At Eurovision 

The 65th edition of the Eurovision Song Contest took place in Rotterdam, the Netherlands and consisted of two semi-finals on 18 May and 20 May 2021, and the grand final on 22 May 2021. On 17 November 2020, it was announced that Belgium would be performing in the second half of the first semi-final of the contest. Hooverphonic performed in the eleventh slot in the semi-final, and qualified for the grand final in 9th place, receiving 117 points. The song finished in 19th place in the final, receiving 74 points.

Charts

Weekly charts

Year-end charts

References 

2021 songs
2021 singles
Eurovision songs of 2021
Eurovision songs of Belgium
Hooverphonic songs
Universal Music Group singles